Seyyedabad (also Romanized as Seyyedābād, Saiyidābād, and Seydābād; also known as Seyyedābād-e Nagnān) is a village in Fakhrud Rural District, Qohestan District, Darmian County, South Khorasan Province, Iran. At the 2006 census, its population was 213, in 57 families.

References 

Populated places in Darmian County